Mont Aorai is a mountain on the island of Tahiti in French Polynesia. With an elevation of  it is the island's third-highest peak, after Mont Orohena and Pito Hiti.

References

Mountains of French Polynesia
Mountains of Tahiti